The Valmara 59 is a large cylindrical Italian bounding anti-personnel mine. It is the first in the "Valmara" family of mines produced by Valsella Meccanotecnica, and was followed by the Valmara 69 and VS-JAP. The mine's body is plastic with a distinctive five-pronged metal head. The central prong has a hole, to allow the threading a trip wire. The inner body of the mine has a main charge surrounded with approximately 1,000 steel cubes, below which is a steel wire connecting it to the base of the mine. When the mine is triggered a small charge launches the mine into the air approximately 45 cm before the steel wire is pulled taut, the jolt of which pulls a striker into the detonator. A secondary time fuse triggers the mine after three seconds if it has not detonated after being triggered.

The fragments produced by the mine are lethal to a range of 25 meters, and are capable of penetrating light armour.

Specifications

 Diameter: 102 mm
 Height: 196 mm
 Weight: 3.2 kg
 Explosive content: Reported between 0.42 kg and 0.56 kg of Composition B with a RDX booster charge.
 Operating pressure: 10.8 kg pressure, 6 kg pull.

See also 
Valmara 69
PROM-1
OZM
M16 mine

References
 Brassey's Essential Guide to Anti-Personnel Landmines, Eddie Banks, 
 

Anti-personnel mines
Land mines of Italy